The men's decathlon event  at the Friendship Games was held on 17 and 18 August 1984 at the Grand Arena of the Central Lenin Stadium in Moscow, Soviet Union.

Results

See also
Athletics at the 1984 Summer Olympics – Men's decathlon

References
 
 1984 results (p27)

Athletics at the Friendship Games
Friendship Games